Municipal election for Bharatpur took place on 13 May 2022, with all 147 positions up for election across 29 wards. The electorate elected a mayor, a deputy mayor, 29 ward chairs and 116 ward members. An indirect election will also be held to elect five female members and an additional three female members from the Dalit and minority community to the municipal executive. 

Renu Dahal of CPN (Maoist Centre) was re-elected as mayor winning 48.3% of the votes and Nepali Congress gained control of the council.

Background 

Bharatpur was established in 1978 as a municipality. The municipality was upgraded to a sub-metropolitan city in 2014 after incorporating neighboring village development committees into Bharatpur municipality. The metropolitan city was created in 2017 after incorporating Narayani municipality, Chitraban municipality and Kalibas VDC into Bharatpur sub-metropolitan city. Electors in each ward elect a ward chair and four ward members, out of which two must be female and one of the two must belong to the Dalit community.

In the previous election, Renu Dahal from CPN (Maoist Centre) was elected as the first mayor of the metropolitan city.

Candidates

Jagannath Paudel 
A veteran Nepali Congress politician and advocate Paudel is an Independent mayoral candidate. Behind Poudel is a team of former presidents of Chitwan Congress Krishnalal Sapkota and Tikaram Neupane, former district secretary Anand Raj Raut, former MP Bhim Bahadur Shrestha, leader Meena Kharel, former president of Tarun Dal Shambhu Aryal and others. Paudel has previously served as deputy mayor of Bharatpur winning election in 2054 BS. He's even served as member of National Assembly. Currently, Election Commission has given him pineapple election symbol. 

Paudel is one the founder of community campus, Balkumari Campus of Bharatpur. Similarly, Paudel has been involving in various social welfare activities.

He's been a threat to both CPN (Maoist Centre) and CPN (UML) candidate while Nepali Congress had obtained the highest wardwise vote in previous elections.

Renu Dahal 
Dahal, a former mayor of Bharatpur is running in the election even this time from CPN (Maoist Centre). Dahal is the daughter of Pushpa Kamal Dahal. Dahal had won 2017 election with the help of Nepali Congress.

Bijay Subedi 
Subedi, a former member of Provincial Assembly of Bagmati Province is the mayoral candidate from CPN (UML). He was put forward by Devi Gyawali who had lost previous elections by a very small margin.

List of Mayor and deputy mayor candidates

Surveys and opinion polls 

National level news agency, Setopati conducted opinion poll among 242 people of Bharatpur of different areas which gave a conclusion that majority Nepali Congress voters were undecided. Some of them were campaigning for Renu Dahal but we're determined to vote Jagannath Paudel during vote to be safe from party expel. Few people who had voted Renu Dahal last time were thinking to vote Jagannath this time. Few voters criticized Puspa Kamal Dahal's statement of accident in country again if his daughter Renu lost the election.

Similarly, all the voters of CPN (UML)-RPP alliance were determined to vote their own candidate. This brought a conclusion that even CPN (UML) could vote Jagannath Paudel in contrition that they were sure of themself not to win. Similarly, there was effect in CPN (UML) vote after party split under leadership of Madhav Nepal.

Exit polls

Results

Mayoral election

Ward results 

|-
! colspan="2" style="text-align:centre;" | Party
! Chairman
! Members
|-
| style="background-color:;" |
| style="text-align:left;" |Nepali Congress
| style="text-align:center;" | 16
| style="text-align:center;" | 58
|-
| style="background-color:;" |
| style="text-align:left;" |CPN (Unified Marxist-Leninist)
| style="text-align:center;" | 6
| style="text-align:center;" | 46
|-
| style="background-color:;" |
| style="text-align:left;" |CPN (Maoist Centre)
| style="text-align:center;" | 3
| style="text-align:center;" | 6
|-
| style="background-color:;" |
| style="text-align:left;" |CPN (Unified Socialist)
| style="text-align:center;" | 3
| style="text-align:center;" | 2
|-
| style="background-color:;" |
| style="text-align:left;" |Rastriya Prajatantra Party
| style="text-align:center;" | 0
| style="text-align:center;" | 4
|-
| style="background-color:;" |
| style="text-align:left;" |Independent
| style="text-align:center;" | 1
| style="text-align:center;" | 0
|-
! colspan="2" style="text-align:right;" | Total
! 29
! 116
|}

Summary of ward results

Results for municipal executive election 
The municipal executive consists of the mayor, who is also the chair of the municipal executive, the deputy mayor and ward chairs from each ward. The members of the municipal assembly will elect five female members and three members from the Dalit and minority community to the municipal executive.

Municipal Assembly composition

Results

Municipal Executive composition

See also 

 2022 Nepalese local elections
 2022 Lalitpur municipal election
 2022 Kathmandu municipal election
 2022 Janakpur municipal election
 2022 Pokhara municipal election

References

Bharatpur